Kashanbeh-ye Chahardangi (also Romanized as Kāshanbeh-ye Chahārdāngī and Kāshanbeh-ye Chahār Dāngī) is a village in Chaqa Narges Rural District, Mahidasht District, Kermanshah County, Kermanshah Province, Iran. At the 2006 census, its population was 198, in 45 families.

References 

Populated places in Kermanshah County